Paiçandu is a city in the state of Paraná in southern Brazil. Paiçandu was founded in 1948, and emancipated on 19 November 1960. Its population was 41,773 (2020) and its area is 171.4 km².

Geography
Altitude: 550 m
Distance from Curitiba, the state capital: 449 km
Distance from Paranaguá, Paraná's primary seaport: 540 km
Distance from Maringá, site of the nearest major airport: 7 km

Climate
Paiçandu's subtropical climate offers hot summers and concentrated wet seasons; Paiçandu has no dry season. The average high temperature is 22 °C. Frost rarely accompanies the winter weather (the average low temperature is 18 °C).

Economy

Participation in the Municipal GIP
Farming: 8.72%
Industry: 38.92%
Services: 52.35%

Number of inhabitants who are actively employed: 14,597

Primary crops
Soy
Maize
Sugar cane

Primary industries
Health and nutrition
Leather
Brewing

See also
List of cities in Brazil

References

Municipalities in Paraná